Around a dozen works are securely attributed to the 13th century Italian painter Cimabue, with several less secure attributions.  None are signed or dated.

 Crucifixes
 Crucifix (Cimabue, Santa Croce), c. 1265, Basilica di Santa Croce, Florence 
 Crucifix (Cimabue, Arezzo), c. 1267–1271, Basilica of San Domenico, Arezzo
 Frescos  c.1277–1280 in the Basilica of Saint Francis of Assisi, Assisi
Nativity and Betrothal of the Virgin
 Choir, central vault, right transept
 Three surviving panels (of eight) from the Diptych of devotion, c.1280
 Christ Mocked
 Virgin and Child with Two Angels, National Gallery, London
 The Flagellation of Christ, Frick Collection, New York
 Maestà or Virgin and Child Enthroned
 Maestà (Cimabue) , c.1280, Pisa, now Louvre
 Maestà of Santa Maria dei Servi, 1280–1285, Basilica di Santa Maria dei Servi, Bologna
 ? Madonna di Castelfiorentino, c.1283–1284, Castelfiorentino
 Santa Trinita, c. 1290–1300, Santa Trinita, Florence, now Uffizi, Florence
 Mosaic ceiling at Florence Baptistery, c.1300
 Mosaic of ''Christ enthroned with the Virgin and St John, Pisa Cathedral, 1301–1302

References
 Cimabue, Le Christ moqué, Hotel des Ventes de Senlis Sarl, 27 October 2019, Turquin

Paintings by Cimabue
Cimabue